The  (Formerly ) was an industry research, development, and standards body for electronics in Japan. It was merged with EIAJ to form JEITA on November 1, 2000.

JEIDA was similar to SEMATECH of the US, ECMA of Europe.

JEIDA developed a number of standards, including the JEIDA memory card, and the Exif graphical file format.

History
in 1967, Ryoko Communications Association Co., Ltd. has first appeared in Shibuya, Tokyo, Japan. in 1989, Ryoko Communications Association Co., Ltd. was Re-branded into Japan Electronic Industries Development Association. in 2000, JEIDA became a Pending merger with EIAJ and was Reorganized into JEITA.

External links
 JEITA Press Releases: JEITA inaugurated today, on November 1, 2000

Electronics industry in Japan
Trade associations based in Japan
Standards organizations in Japan
Organizations established in 1967
Organizations disestablished in 2000
1967 establishments in Japan
2000 disestablishments in Japan
Defunct organizations based in Japan